Stenbock House is a prominent neo-classical building located on Toompea hill, Tallinn.  It is the official seat of the Government of Estonia.

History

The history of the Stenbock house in Tallinn goes back to the 1780s, when the Russian Imperial administration of what was then the Governorate of Estonia launched a scheme to erect new buildings for administrative purposes. Originally, the building was intended as a courthouse. Count Jakob Pontus Stenbock, a member of the  local nobility and landowner with an estate on the island of Hiiumaa, won the tender to erect a new building on Toompea hill in the middle of Tallinn's medieval centre. The architect for the new house was Johann Caspar Mohr, a provincial architect who was responsible for the maintenance of public buildings in Estonia and a popular designer of local manor houses.

The construction of the building started in 1787. Almost immediately, however, the Russian state ran low on funds as a result of expenditures in connection with the ongoing Russo-Turkish War. As a result, the province became indebted to Stenbock, and the unfinished building passed into his possession. He subsequently used it as his Tallinn residence, and the building still bears its name in his remembrance. In 1828, after Stenbock's death, the building passed between different owners until 1899, when it finally became the property of the Governorate administration and at last actually began to be used as a courthouse.

During both the first period of independence of Estonia (1919-1940) and during the Soviet occupation (to 1991) it continued to be used as a courthouse. The maintenance of the building was, however, gravely neglected during the Soviet years; among other things, the ceilings of two courtrooms and the archive of the court collapsed. When the Estonian Government assumed ownership in the early 1990s, the whole building was in risk of collapse. A complete renovation was carried out between 1996 and 2000. The newly renovated building became the official seat of the Estonian Government at its re-opening in 2000.

Architecture
The architectural style of the building is a rather simple form of neo-classicism. The front façade is adorned by six pilasters and two semi-pilasters made of dolomite from Saaremaa and a dentiled pediment. It faces a semi-circular courtyard surrounded by less ornate outbuildings. The street front of the building is therefore characterised by the rather unassuming outbuildings. On the building wall facing the street, there is a memorial plaque with the names of Estonian members of parliament and government who lost their lives during the Sovietization of Estonia. The best-known view of the building (illustration) is of its back, which by its location at the edge of Toompea hill enjoys an unobstructed view of the sea. This face is dominated by a large balcony raised on Doric columns. All in all, the exterior of the building still more or less reflects the original edifice. The interior was, as mentioned, badly damaged during the Soviet era, but has been reconstructed, at least in part.

References

External links
 

Buildings and structures in Tallinn
Government buildings in Estonia
Kesklinn, Tallinn
Government buildings completed in 1792
18th-century establishments in Estonia
Tallinn Old Town